The Punjabi calendar (Punjabi:) is a luni-solar calendar used by the Punjabi people in Punjab and around the world, but varies by religions. Historically, the Punjabi Sikhs and Punjabi Hindus have used the Nanakshahi calendar and ancient Bikrami (Vikrami) calendar respectively. Punjabi Muslims use the Arabic Hijri calendar. Some festivals in Punjab, Pakistan are determined by the Punjabi calendar, such as Muharram which is celebrated twice, once according to the Muslim year and again on the 10th of harh/18th of jeth. The Bikrami calendar is the one the rural (agrarian) population follows in Punjab, Pakistan.

In Punjab though the solar calendar is generally followed, the lunar calendar used is purṇimānta, or calculated from the ending moment of the full moon: the beginning of the dark fortnight. Chait is considered to be the first month of the lunar year. The lunar year begins on Chet Sudi: the first day after the new moon in Chet. This means that the first half of the purṇimānta month of Chaitra goes to the previous year, while the second half belongs to the new Lunar year.

The Punjabi solar new year starts on the first of Vaisakh. The day is considered from sunrise to next sunrise and for the first day of the solar months, the Orissa rule is observed: day 1 of the month occurs on the day of the transition of monthly constellations, or sangrānd in Punjabi.

Months (solar)

See also
 Buddhist calendar
 Hindu calendar
 Indian national calendar
 Islamic calendar
 Nepali Calendar
 Nanakshahi calendar

Notes

References

Punjabi culture
Time in India
Lunisolar calendars